Apisa grisescens is a moth of the family Erebidae. It was described by Abel Dufrane in 1945. It is found in the Democratic Republic of the Congo, Malawi, Mozambique and Zimbabwe.

References

Moths described in 1945
Syntomini
Lepidoptera of the Democratic Republic of the Congo
Lepidoptera of Mozambique
Lepidoptera of Malawi
Lepidoptera of Zimbabwe
Erebid moths of Africa